Hordeum comosum is a species of wild barley in the family Poaceae. It is native to Chile and western and southern Argentina, and has been introduced to the Falkland Islands. A widespread perennial grass, it is an important forage as it is relished by sheep.

References

comosum
Forages
Flora of northern Chile
Flora of central Chile
Flora of southern Chile
Flora of Northwest Argentina
Flora of South Argentina
Plants described in 1830